Sri Sathya Narayana High School, Perla (known as SNHS, Perla) is an aided high school situated in Perla,  Enmakaje village of Kasaragod district, Kerala State of India. It provides education till class X in Kannada and English as languages of instruction. This co-educational school is affiliated to the General Education Department of the Government of Kerala.

History
It was established by Sri Parthaje Venkatramana Bhat as a primary school in 1925 and later it was upgraded to a high school in the year 1945. This school is aided and recognized by the Government of Kerala.

The manager of the school is Shri Krishna Viswamithra (son of Sri Parthaje Venkatramana Bhat) and the headmaster is B Rajendra.

Languages
This locality is an essentially multi-lingual region. The people speak Malayalam, Kannada, Tulu, Beary bashe and Konkani. Migrant workers also speak Hindi and Tamil languages.

Administration
This village is part of Manjeswaram assembly constituency which is again part of Kasaragod (Lok Sabha constituency)

References

External links 
 Official Blogspot page of the School
 Official Wordpress page of the School

Schools in Kasaragod district
Educational institutions established in 1925
1925 establishments in India
Manjeshwar area